Maabus is an action-adventure game developed by Canadian studio Microforum International and published by Monolith Productions in 1994.

Gameplay
The player is in control of a weaponized probe sent to a remote tropical island where strange dangerous radiation has been detected, and must fight giant creatures, solve puzzles and find the source of the radiation.

Reception
Next Generation reviewed the PC version of the game, rating it one star out of five, and stated that "unless looking at a handful of pretty pictures and dying in countlessly unpredictable ways is your idea of fun, spend your money on something else."

Entertainment Weekly gave the game an A- and described the game as a combination of Myst, Doom, and The 7th Guest. They wrote that the game is as addictive as any of the games it draws inspiration from.

Trish Murphy for The Sydney Morning Herald said that "Despite its quirks, I found Maabus imaginative, challenging and great to play."

Reviews
PC Gamer (Jun, 1995)
PC Games - May, 1995
PC Player - May, 1995

References

1994 video games
Action-adventure games
DOS games
First-person video games
Video games developed in Canada
Windows games
Monolith Productions games